Wild Guitar is a 1962 American comedy-drama musical film directed by Ray Dennis Steckler and starring Arch Hall Jr., Arch Hall Sr. (credited as William Watters), Ray Dennis Steckler (credited as Cash Flagg), and Nancy Czar. The film was produced by Arch Hall Sr. The film was targeted towards the drive-in market, and is generally regarded as a B-movie, but has become infamous as part of a series of films made by Arch Hall Sr., which starred his son, Arch Hall Jr.

Plot
Bud Eagle (Arch Hall Jr.), a young singer-songwriter, arrives in Hollywood on a motorcycle. At Marge's Koffee Kup Cafe, he meets Vickie (Nancy Czar), an aspiring dancer, who quizzes him about his "gimmick" and promises to give him the "inside dope" on the music industry. He attends her performance at a television variety show later that night. When the scheduled saxophonist is unable to perform, Bud steps in with a ballad that earns him a standing ovation.

Bud's performance also earns the notice of talent scout Mike McCauley (Arch Hall Sr.), who offers him a record deal. Bud accepts the McCauley's proposal. McCauley immediately installs Bud in a penthouse apartment, providing him with tailored suits, a Fender Jazzmaster, a mini tape recorder, and a new backing band ready to record his songs. Bud's music career takes off in spite of his mounting doubts about the unscrupulous McCauley, who pays high school students to promote his music at their schools. Bud attempts to leave McCauley more than once, but relents when McCauley reminds him of the money he's owed. Bud performs "Vickie" (also heard in the less contextually-appropriate Eegah) live on television, and Vickie sees the broadcast. She runs to the television studio where they joyfully reunite. They spend the night ice skating in Vickie's uncle's rink; Nancy Czar being a former figure skater

When Bud returns to his penthouse apartment, he is confronted by Don Proctor, McCauley's previous client. He warns Bud that McCauley is cheating him, and manipulating him. McCauley's henchman, Steak (Ray Dennis Steckler), arrives with a girl, Daisy, who begins to dance seductively, distracting Bud while Steak and Proctor go outside to fight. Steak throws Proctor down a staircase. As Daisy kisses Bud, Vickie walks in, and runs out again in tears. Bud chases after her but is kidnapped by a trio of comical bums from Marge's Koffee Kup Cafe.

Eager to take advantage of McCauley, Bud helps the kidnappers to plan the crime, encouraging them to ask for more ransom money. They try to share the money with him, but he refuses. Steak breaks into the kidnappers' hideout, the group scatters, and Bud goes into hiding. He takes a job as a dishwasher at Marge's Koffee Kup Cafe, where he and Vickie reconcile, but are quickly apprehended by McCauley and Steak, who threaten violence if Bud does not return to them.

After a climactic fist fight between Steak and Bud, Steak flees, and Bud demands that McCauley reform his dishonest business. McCauley refuses. Bud reveals that he has recorded the incriminating conversation using the mini tape recorder, and he threatens to make the recording public. McCauley relents, promising to manage Bud's career fairly from now on. The film closes with scenes of Vickie and Bud dancing together on the beach as Bud sings "Twist Fever."

Cast
 Arch Hall Jr. as Bud Eagle
 Arch Hall Sr. as Mike McCauley (credited as William Watters)
 Nancy Czar as Vickie Wills
 Ray Dennis Steckler as Steak (credited as Cash Flagg)
 Marie Denn as Marge
 Carolyn Brandt as Dancer on Ramp (Uncredited)
 Virginia Broderick as Daisy
 Robert Crumb as Don Proctor
 Rick Dennis as Stage Manager
 Jonathan Karle as Kidnapper No. 3
 William Lloyd as Weasel
 Al Scott as Ted Eagle
 Mike Treibor as Brains (Kidnapper #1)
 Paul Voorhees as Hal Kenton

Production notes
The screenplay was written by Arch Hall Sr. (under the name Nicholas Merriwether), Joe Thomas, and Bob Wehling, and the musical director was a high school friend of Arch Hall Jr., the young Alan O'Day, who went on to record a number 1 pop hit called "Undercover Angel" in the 1970s.

Legacy
In 2005, the film was featured in an episode of Deadly Cinema.

Nicholas Winding Refn is a fan of the film as well to the point of restoring and featuring it on the Black Deer Film Festival in 2019.

Notes

External links 
 
 
 
 Wild Guitar on byNWR

1962 films
1962 independent films
1960s musical drama films
American musical drama films
American black-and-white films
Films set in Los Angeles
Films shot in Los Angeles
American independent films
1962 directorial debut films
1962 drama films
1960s English-language films
1960s American films